Elias I of Antioch was the Patriarch of Antioch and head of the Syriac Orthodox Church from 709 until his death in 723. He is commemorated as a saint by the Syriac Orthodox Church in the Martyrology of Rabban Sliba, and his feast day is 3 November.

Biography
Elias was born to a Chalcedonian family, but joined the non-Chalcedonian Syriac Orthodox Church upon reading the works of Severus of Antioch. Elias succeeded Julian III as patriarch of Antioch in 709, and was consecrated at the monastery of Gubo Baroyo. Elias' consecration is placed in 709 (AG 1020) by the Chronicle of 819, the Chronicle of 846, the Chronicle of Michael the Syrian, and the Ecclesiastical History of Bar Hebraeus, whereas the Zuqnin Chronicle gives 708 (AG 1019).

Upon his ascension to the patriarchal office, Elias released Denha, archbishop of Tikrit, who had been imprisoned by the Patriarch Julian III at the monastery of Qenneshre for insubordination, and accompanied him on his return to Tikrit to ensure he was accepted there before returning to his residence at the monastery of Gubo Baroyo. Elias presented himself before the Caliph Al-Walid I at Hasarta, and was honoured by him.

Elias consecrated a church at Sarmada in Syria in 722, despite the protestations of the local Chalcedonians. He became the first non-Chalcedonian patriarch of Antioch to enter Antioch since the deposition of Severus of Antioch in 518 when, in the last year of his life, he consecrated a new church there. Elias died at the age of eighty-two on 3 October 723, and was buried at the monastery of Gubo Baroyo. Elias' death is placed in 723 (AG 1035) by the Chronicle of 819, the Chronicle of 846, and the histories of Michael the Syrian and  Bar Hebraeus, whilst it is dated to 729 (AG 1041) by the Zuqnin Chronicle.

Works
Whilst bishop of Apamea, Elias composed a defence of the christological doctrine of the Syriac Orthodox Church in a letter in response to Leo, the Chalcedonian bishop of Harran. The forty-page letter consisted of twelve chapters, and cited Church Fathers, including Athanasius of Alexandria, Gregory of Nazianzus, Gregory of Nyssa, Ambrose, and Cyril of Alexandria. He also referenced Simeon of the Olives, the non-Chalcedonian bishop of Harran, and the Chalcedonian bishops John of Damascus, George of Martyropolis, and Constantine of Harran. The letter survives in two manuscripts.

As patriarch, Elias wrote a letter with George, bishop of Ruḥīn, to the clergy of the village of Ruḥīn; only an extract of the letter is still extant.

References

Bibliography

Elias I
8th-century Oriental Orthodox archbishops
723 deaths
Syriac writers
Syriac Orthodox Church saints
8th-century Syrian people
7th-century Syrian people
Christians from the Umayyad Caliphate
7th-century Christian saints
7th-century writers
8th-century writers
Syrian Christian saints